Best! Movies! Ever! is a weekly series that aimed to present "the greatest moments in movie history". Each half-hour episode presented a themed "top 10 list" in which a rotating cast of Canadian media personalities (such as film critics, videographers, etc.) give their reasons as to why the selected scene is (or sometimes, should not be) considered to be one of the ten great moments appropriate to that week's theme.

Guest stars included Kim Poirier, Richard Crouse, Azed Majeed, Lisa Schwartzman, Maggie Cassella, Tré Armstrong and Tracy Melchor.

External links
 

Film criticism television series
2006 Canadian television series debuts
2007 Canadian television series endings
2000s Canadian documentary television series
English-language television shows